Bad Laer is a municipality and health resort in the district of Osnabrück, in Lower Saxony, Germany. It is situated in the Teutoburg Forest, approx. 20 km south of Osnabrück.

The municipality includes Bad Laer and five outlying districts Remsede, Müschen, Hardensetten, Westerwiede and Winkelsetten.

References 

Osnabrück (district)
Spa towns in Germany